The Little Luckiamute River is a stream in Polk County in the U.S. state of Oregon.

Flowing generally east from its source near Fanno Peak, the river parallels Fanno Ridge, which is to the right. Lost Creek enters from the left at a rapids, and Camp Creek enters from the left  from the mouth. About  further on, the river passes over a waterfall. Approaching the unincorporated community of Black Rock, Little Luckiamute River receives Black Rock Creek from the left at river mile (RM) 17 or river kilometer (RK) 27. For several miles starting at Black Rock, the George T. Gerlinger Experimental Forest is on the river's left.

Gerlinger County Park is on the right at RM 15 (RK 24). At the falls, the river plunges  into a gorge within a city park. 
Turning southeast, the river receives Waymire Creek from the left, then Teal Creek from the right, then passes under Oregon Route 223 at about RM 8 (RK 13).

See also
List of rivers of Oregon
List of longest streams of Oregon

References

External links
Luckiamute Watershed Council

Rivers of Polk County, Oregon
Rivers of Oregon